The Girls' Singles tournament of the 2017 European Junior Badminton Championships was held from April 11-16. Mia Blichfeldt from Denmark clinched this title in the last edition. Danish Julie Dawall Jakobsen leads the seedings this year.

Seeded

  Julie Dawall Jakobsen (champions)
  Clara Azurmendi (quarter-finals)
  Reka Madarasz (third round)
  Anastasiia Semenova (third round)
  Sara Penalver (third round)
  Yaëlle Hoyaux (quarter-finals)
  Irina Amalie Andersen (semi-finals)
  Vivien Sandorhazi (quarter-finals)
  Tereza Svabikova (quarter-finals)
  Leonice Huet (third round)
  Margot Lambert (third round)
  Maryna Ilyinskaya (finals)
  Wiktoria Dabczynska (second round)
  Yvonne Li (semi-finals)
  Monika Svetnickova (third round)
  Holly Newall (first round)

Draw

Finals

Top Half

Section 1

Section 2

Section 3

Section 4

Bottom Half

Section 5

Section 6

Section 7

Section 8

References

External links 
Main Draw

European Junior Badminton Championships